In baseball statistics, a putout (denoted by PO or fly out when appropriate) is given to a defensive player who records an out by tagging a runner with the ball when he is not touching a base, catching a batted or thrown ball and tagging a base to put out a batter or runner (a force out), catching a thrown ball and tagging a base to record an out on an appeal play, catching a third strike (a strikeout), catching a batted ball on the fly (a flyout), or being positioned closest to a runner called out for interference. Shortstop, abbreviated SS, is a baseball or softball fielding position in the infield, commonly stationed between second and third base, which is considered to be among the most demanding defensive positions. The position is mostly filled by defensive specialists, so shortstops are generally relatively poor batters who typically hit lower in the batting order. In the numbering system used to record defensive plays, the shortstop is assigned the number 6.

Putouts are most commonly recorded by shortstops by stepping on second base after receiving a throw from the first baseman, second baseman, or pitcher to force out a runner on a ground out, often beginning a double play; a shortstop generally benefits in this respect from playing alongside an excellent second baseman with great range and quickness. Other ways in which shortstops often record a putout include catching a pop-up or line drive, fielding a ground ball close enough to second base that they can step on the bag for a force out before the runner advances from first base, tagging a runner after a throw from the catcher or pitcher on a stolen base attempt or a pickoff play, receiving a throw from an outfielder to tag out a runner trying to stretch a single into a double, receiving a throw to retire a runner who fails to tag up on a fly ball out, receiving a throw to force out a runner on a bunt (possibly a sacrifice hit attempt), and tagging a runner stranded between bases in a rundown play. Sometimes a shortstop will record a putout while covering third base if the third baseman is charging toward the plate on an expected bunt. Occasionally, a shortstop can record two putouts on a single play; with a runner taking a lead off second base and less than two out, the shortstop can catch a line drive near the base, then step on the bag before the runner can return, completing a double play; alternately, if a runner on first base breaks for second base when the ball is hit, the shortstop can catch a line drive and tag the runner before they can stop and return to first. On eight occasions in major league history, a shortstop has recorded three putouts on a single play for an unassisted triple play, always by catching a line drive, then stepping on second base and tagging the runner advancing from first base.

As strikeout totals have risen in baseball, the frequency of other defensive outs including ground outs has declined; as a result, putout totals for second basemen have likewise declined. The top five career leaders all began their careers prior to 1916, and only four of the top 16 were active after 1950, and only two of them after 1973. Through 2022, only six of the top 40 single-season totals have been recorded since 1922, and none of the top 85 since 1949; none of the top 181 have been recorded since 1964, and only three of the top 485 have been recorded since 1992. Rabbit Maranville is the all-time leader in career putouts as a shortstop with 5,139; he is the only shortstop to record more than 5,000 career putouts.

Key

List

Stats updated through the 2022 season

Other Hall of Famers

Notes

References

External links

Major League Baseball statistics
Putouts as a shortstop